Ivan Brkić may refer to:

 Ivan Brkić (actor) (1960–2015), Croatian actor
 Ivan Brkić (footballer) (born 1995), Croatian footballer